Petra Macliing is a famous anti-Chico dam activist, hailing from Mainit, Bontoc and best known as "Mother Petra". She joined the indigenous peoples of Bontoc and Kalinga in the fight to protect their "ili" (home village) against a World Bank funded dam project in the Philippines. She is a founding member of Cordillera People's Alliance and leader of the Montañosa Women's Federation. She is also a member of the Kalinga-Bontoc Peace Pact Holders Association (KBPPHA) and the Cordillera Elders Alliance (CEA). She founded Mainit Ub-ubfo and the Maiinit Irrigators Association.

Personal life 
Macliing was widowed at a young age, resulting in her having to raise eight children by herself. Macliing had seven daughters and one son, but her son passed away at a young age. To support her family, Macliing worked as a farmer, sold saris and managing to send all of her daughters to college. Her youngest daughter, lawyer Francesca Macliing-Claver, recounted that she was only 3 months old when her father passed away. “My mother was the only parent I have ever known,” said Francesca.

Awards And Recognition
2009 Laureate of the Women's World Summit Foundation's (WSSF) Prize for Rural Women for the year 2009 
Gawad Tanggol Karapatan in 2008

References

Filipino activists
People from Mountain Province
Year of birth missing (living people)
Living people